Tommy Ryman (born March 17, 1983) is an American stand-up comedian who was a semifinalist on Season 8 of the TV show Last Comic Standing.
After getting his start in the Minnesota comedy scene, Paste magazine named him one of 12 Great Stand-Up Comedians from the Midwest.  In 2015, he won Best of Midwest at Gilda's Laugh Fest. In 2018, he was invited to perform at the Great American Comedy Festival at Johnny Carson Theater, first performing there in 2010.  In 2016, he was named "Best Local Standup Comedian" by City Pages. He refrains from off-color humor, instead relying on observational comedy, sarcasm, and satire; in doing so, he gained recognition in 2018 on VidAngel's Dry Bar Comedy Season 3 series entitled Activated.

Personal
Tommy married his wife, Megan, in 2013 and the ceremony was officiated by comedian and actor Rob Little.  They reside in Minneapolis, Minnesota.  His mother is folk singer-songwriter Barb Ryman.  His early comedic inspiration came from the late Mitch Hedberg.

Discography
Bath Time With Tommy Ryman (2011) by Stand Up! Records
Having the Time of My Life (2018) by Stand Up! Records

TV/Film/Podcast

References

External links

1983 births
Living people
American stand-up comedians
Comedians from Minnesota
People from Redondo Beach, California
Comedians from California
21st-century American comedians
Stand Up! Records artists